Sanyam Shukla (born 19 April 1996) is an Indian badminton player who plays for Chhattisgarh badminton team. In 2015, he won the Mauritius International tournament in the men's doubles event partnered with Ramchandran Shlok. Shukla was part of the national men's team member that won the gold medal in 2019 South Asian Games.

Achievements

BWF International Challenge/Series (4 titles, 4 runners-up) 
Men's doubles

Mixed doubles

  BWF International Challenge tournament
  BWF International Series tournament
  BWF Future Series tournament

References

External links 
 

Living people
1996 births
Indian male badminton players
South Asian Games gold medalists for India
South Asian Games medalists in badminton